Ching Ho Estate is a public housing estate located in Sheung Shui, New Territories, Hong Kong near Elegantia College, Tsang Mui Millennium School and Tung Wah Group of Hospitals Ma Kam Chan Memorial Primary School (Main Campus). The estate is developed into three phases, with a total of 8 "New Harmony" residential buildings and a shopping centre. Phase 3 consists of three blocks completed in 2007 while Phases 1 and 2 consist of a total of five blocks and a shopping centre completed in 2008.

Houses

Demographics
According to the 2016 by-census, Ching Ho Estate had a population of 20,257. The median age was 39.4 and the majority of residents (99.3 per cent) were of Chinese ethnicity. The average household size was 2.9 people. The median monthly household income of all households (i.e. including both economically active and inactive households) was HK$17,500.

Politics
Ching Ho Estate is located in Ching Ho constituency of the North District Council. It was formerly represented by Yuen Ho-lun, who was elected in the 2019 elections until May 2021.

COVID-19 pandemic
Ching Long House in Ching Ho Estate was placed under lockdown for mandatory tests between 15 and 17 February 2022, with at least 48 preliminary positive cases uncovered.

See also

Public housing estates in Sheung Shui

References

Residential buildings completed in 2007
Residential buildings completed in 2008
Sheung Shui
Public housing estates in Hong Kong